Louise Diane d'Orléans (27 June 1716 – 26 September 1736) was Princess of Conti from her marriage to Prince Louis François in 1732, until her death in childbirth. She was the youngest child of Philippe II, Duke of Orléans and Françoise Marie de Bourbon, the youngest legitimised daughter of King Louis XIV of France and his mistress Madame de Montespan. She was born while her father was the regent for Louis XV. Some sources referred to her as Louis Diane.

Biography
Louise Diane d'Orléans was born in the Palais-Royal, the Paris residence of the House of Orléans, on 27 June 1716 as the youngest child of the Philippe II, Duke of Orléans and Françoise Marie de Bourbon.

Until her marriage, Louise was known as Mademoiselle de Chartres. The style of Mademoiselle de Chartres had been used by her elder sister Adélaïde, who, by the time of Louise Diane's birth, was a nun at Chelles. Her aunt Élisabeth Charlotte d'Orléans also used the title. 

Louise, who grew up with her younger sister Élisabeth, received a religious education. Her sister would later become the queen of Spain as the wife of Louis I of Spain.

Louise grew up in an era when her father, known as Philippe d'Orléans, or simply le Régent, was the de facto ruler of France, as he had been in charge of the affairs of the state since the death of Louise's maternal grandfather King Louis XIV. The Palais-Royal was where the régent held his court and lived openly with his mistress Marie Thérèse de Parabère. Her mother later acquired the Château de Bagnolet, where she lived quietly and without scandal.

As a member of the reigning House of Bourbon, she was a princesse du sang. As her mother, by then the Duchess of Orléans, was illegitimate by birth, Louise, like her siblings, was not a petite-fille de France.

In her youth, she was said to have been a very sensitive child and would grow up to be one of the more beautiful of the regent's daughters. As she was another girl (1 of 7 overall), her birth was not necessarily greeted with the joy that had met that of her brother, Louis, Duke of Orléans. Upon the death of her father in 1723, at Versailles, at the age of forty-nine, her only brother inherited the title of Duke of Orléans and, in 1724, he married Margravine Johanna of Baden-Baden.

In December 1731, it was decided that she should marry her cousin Louis François de Bourbon, Prince of Conti. Her marriage was arranged by her mother Françoise Marie and her first cousin (and subsequent mother-in-law) Louise Élisabeth, Dowager Princess of Conti.

After being baptised on 19 January 1732 by the Cardinal of Rohan (then the Grand Almoner of France), she married the Prince of Conti three days later, on 22 January. The marriage ceremony took place at the Palace of Versailles. Louise was then fifteen years old. At her wedding, her Condé cousin, Élisabeth Alexandrine de Bourbon, had the honour of holding her train.

After the marriage, she became known at court as Her Serene Highness, the Princess of Conti. Her husband had succeeded to the Conti title in 1727 upon the death of his father Louis Armand II, Prince of Conti. In 1734, Louise gave birth to a son, heir to the Conti name, and, in 1736, to a second child who died at birth.

Louise died in childbirth on 26 September 1736 at Issy, outside Paris. She was buried at the Saint-André-des-Arcs church. At her death, due to the Queen Marie Leszczyńska being otherwise engaged, the queen sent Louise's cousin Marie Anne de Bourbon (Mademoiselle de Clermont) to represent her at Issy.

Her only surviving son, Louis François Joseph, was the last Prince of Conti.

Issue
 Louis François Joseph de Bourbon, Prince of Conti (1 September 1734 – 13 March 1814); married his first cousin, Princess Maria Fortunata of Modena, and had no legitimate issue.
 Stillborn son* (26 September 1736).

References

Sources

House of Bourbon-Conti
Princesses of Conti
1716 births
Princesses of the Blood
1736 deaths
House of Orléans
Deaths in childbirth
House of Bourbon
18th-century French people
People of the Regency of Philippe d'Orléans
People of the Ancien Régime
Nobility from Paris
Princesses of France (Bourbon)